Mirko Bavče (born 15 July 1942) is a Slovenian cross-country skier. He competed at the 1964 Winter Olympics and the 1968 Winter Olympics.

References

1942 births
Living people
Slovenian male cross-country skiers
Olympic cross-country skiers of Yugoslavia
Cross-country skiers at the 1964 Winter Olympics
Cross-country skiers at the 1968 Winter Olympics
People from Prevalje